Huachu Town is a rural town in Puding County, Guizhou, China.

Administrative division
As of January 2016, the town is divided into 1 community, Huachu Community, and 34 villages: Huachu, Boren, Shuijing, Shuimu, Jiawo, Jiaojia, Dongkou, Tianba, Duobei, Bogai, Laliu, Mirun, Huachu Xinzhai, Hujiawan, Xiongjialin, Zhangjiazhai, Lingai, Jiada, Boza, Shuimu Xinzhai, Xiashuimu, Pianpo, Baiguo, Taojiazhai, Laoshuimu, Yuanbei, Houshan, Huoba, Xiazhichang, Changjing, Yanfeng, Lanba, Shanmu, and Shabao.

Geography

Climate
The town experience a subtropical plateau monthly rheumatic and moist climate, enjoying four distinct seasons and abundant precipitation.

Economy
This area is rich in coal, magnesium and granite.

The Duobei Tribute Tea is a local characteristic cash crop.

Transportation
The Puding-Sanbanqiao Road passes across the town.

Religion
Xianren Temple is a Buddhist temple in the town.

References

Divisions of Puding County